Say It with Diamonds may refer to:

 Say It with Diamonds (1927 film), silent film
 Say It with Diamonds (1935 film), British film